Amalia Bernabé (1895–1983) was an Argentine stage and film actress. She appeared in around fifty films during her screen career which stretched from the Golden Age of Argentine Cinema to the 1980s.

Selected filmography
 The Boys Didn't Wear Hair Gel Before (1937)
 Three Argentines in Paris (1938)
 Encadenado (1940)
 Story of a Bad Woman (1948)
 Corrientes, Street of Dreams (1949)
 Valentina (1950)
 The Street Next to the Moon (1951)
 The Beast Must Die (1952)
 The Grandfather (1954)
 Rosaura at 10 O'clock (1954)

References

Bibliography 
Pellettieri, Osvaldo. Pirandello y el teatro argentino (1920-1990). Editorial Galerna, 1997.

External links 
 

1895 births
1983 deaths
Argentine film actresses
Argentine stage actresses
People from Buenos Aires
Bernabé